Robert Franklin Stroud (January 28, 1890 – November 21, 1963), known as the "Birdman of Alcatraz", was a convicted murderer, American federal prisoner and author who has been cited as one of the most notorious criminals in the United States. During his time at Leavenworth Penitentiary, he reared and sold birds and became a respected ornithologist. From 1942 to 1959, he was incarcerated at Alcatraz, where regulations did not allow him to keep birds. Stroud was never released from the federal prison system; he was imprisoned from 1909 to his death in 1963.

Born in Seattle, Washington, Stroud ran away from his abusive father at the age of 13. By the time he was 18, he had become a pimp in the Alaska Territory. In January 1909, he shot and killed a bartender who attacked his mistress, a crime for which he was sentenced to 12 years in the federal penitentiary on McNeil Island in Puget Sound.  Stroud gained a reputation as a dangerous inmate who frequently had confrontations with fellow inmates and staff. In 1916, he stabbed and killed a guard. Stroud was convicted of first-degree murder and sentenced to death by hanging, but after several trials, his sentence was commuted to life imprisonment in solitary confinement.

In 1920, while in solitary confinement at the federal penitentiary of Leavenworth, Stroud discovered a nest with three injured sparrows in the prison yard. He cared for them and within a few years had acquired a collection of about 300 canaries. He began extensive research into birds after being granted equipment by a prison-reforming warden. Stroud wrote Diseases of Canaries, which was smuggled out of Leavenworth and published in 1933, as well as a later edition (1943). He made important contributions to avian pathology, most notably a cure for the hemorrhagic septicemia family of diseases, gaining much respect and some level of sympathy among ornithologists and farmers. Stroud ran a successful business from inside prison, but his activities infuriated the prison staff. He was transferred to Alcatraz in 1942 after it was discovered that he had been secretly making alcohol by using some of the equipment in his cell.

Stroud began serving a 17-year term at Alcatraz Federal Penitentiary on December 19, 1942, and became inmate No. 594. In 1943, he was assessed by psychiatrist Romney M. Ritchey, who diagnosed him as a psychopath, with an I.Q. of 112. Stripped of his birds and equipment, he wrote a history of the penal system.

For all the negative reports written about Robert Stroud and his behavior, in what came to be called The Battle of Alcatraz in May 1946, he made efforts to protect other inmates. Then fifty-six years old, Stroud climbed over the third tier railing and lowered himself to the second tier, then dropped onto the floor of D Block. In what seemed to be a valiant move, he started closing the front solid steel doors of the six isolation cells to protect the helpless men. Stroud yelled to the Warden, explaining that there were no firearms in D Block and that those involved in violence had retreated to another section of the prison. He made it clear that many innocent men would die if the guards continued to fire into D Block.

In 1959, Stroud was transferred to the Medical Center for Federal Prisoners in Springfield, Missouri, where he remained until his death on November 21, 1963, the day before the Assassination of John F. Kennedy.

Early life and arrest
Stroud was born in Seattle, the eldest child of Elizabeth Jane (née McCartney, 1860–1938) and Benjamin Franklin Stroud. His mother had two daughters from a previous marriage. His father was an abusive alcoholic, and Stroud ran away from home at the age of 13.

By the time he was 18, Stroud had made his way to Cordova, Alaska, where he met 36-year-old Kitty O'Brien, a prostitute and dance-hall entertainer, for whom he pimped in Juneau. On January 18, 1909, while he was away at work, an acquaintance, barman F. K. "Charlie" von Dahmer, allegedly failed to pay O'Brien for her services and beat her, tearing a locket from her neck that contained a picture of her daughter. Upon discovering the incident, Stroud confronted von Dahmer, and a struggle resulted in the latter's death from a gunshot wound. Stroud went to the police station, and surrendered himself and the gun. According to police reports, Stroud knocked von Dahmer unconscious and then shot him at point-blank range.

Stroud's mother retained a lawyer, but he was found guilty of manslaughter on August 23, 1909, and sentenced to 12 years in the federal penitentiary at McNeil Island, Washington, in Puget Sound. As Alaska was then a United States territory without its own judiciary, Stroud's case was handled in the federal system.

Prison life

Known as Prisoner #1853, Stroud was one of the most violent prisoners at McNeil Island, frequently feuding with fellow inmates and staff, and was also prone to many different physical ailments. Stroud reportedly stabbed a fellow prisoner who reported him for stealing food from the kitchen. He also assaulted a hospital orderly who reported him to prison administration for attempting to obtain morphine through threats and intimidation. He also reportedly stabbed another inmate who was involved in the attempt to smuggle the narcotics.

On September 5, 1912, Stroud was sentenced to an additional six months for the attacks, and was transferred from McNeil Island to the federal penitentiary in Leavenworth, Kansas. On March 26, 1916, Stroud was reprimanded by cafeteria guard Andrew F. Turner for a minor rule violation that would have annulled Stroud's visitation privilege to meet his younger brother, whom he had not seen in 8 years. With a 6-inch shiv, Stroud fatally stabbed Turner through the heart.

Stroud was convicted of first-degree murder for the stabbing and sentenced to death by hanging by the judge, a sentence that was overturned by the court of appeals. He was convicted in a second trial on May 28, 1917, but after receiving a life sentence, the Solicitor General John W. Davis voluntarily submitted a "confessed error" because he wanted Stroud to receive the death penalty. Stroud was tried a third time in May 1918, and on June 28, he was again sentenced to death by hanging.

Stroud's mother appealed to President Woodrow Wilson, and the execution was halted on April 15, 1920, eight days before it was to be carried out. Stroud's sentence was commuted to life imprisonment. Leavenworth's warden, T. W. Morgan, strongly opposed the decision, given Stroud's reputation for violence. Morgan persuaded the President to stipulate that since Stroud was originally sentenced to await his death sentence in solitary confinement, those conditions should prevail until the halted execution could be carried out. President Wilson's Attorney General, Alexander Mitchell Palmer, saw to it that Stroud would spend the rest of his life in solitary confinement.

The Birdman of Leavenworth

While at Leavenworth in 1920, Stroud found a nest with three injured sparrows in the prison yard, and raised them to adulthood. Prisoners were sometimes allowed to buy canaries, and Stroud had started to add to his collection. He occupied his time raising and caring for his birds, which he could sell for supplies and to help support his mother. According to Stroud, he used a "razor blade and nail for tools" and made his first bird cage out of wooden crates.

Soon thereafter, Leavenworth's administration changed, and William Biddle took over as warden. Impressed with the possibility of presenting Leavenworth as a progressive rehabilitation penitentiary, Biddle furnished Stroud with cages, chemicals, and stationery to conduct his ornithological activities. Visitors were shown Stroud's aviary, and many purchased his canaries.

Over the years, he raised nearly 300 canaries in his cells. He also wrote two books, the 60,000-word treatise Diseases of Canaries (1933), which was smuggled out of Leavenworth, and a later edition, Stroud's Digest on the Diseases of Birds (1943), with updated, specific information. He made several important contributions to avian pathology, most notably a cure for the hemorrhagic septicemia family of diseases. He gained respect and also some level of sympathy in the bird-loving field.

Stroud's activities created problems for the prison management. According to regulations, each letter sent or received at the prison had to be read, copied, and approved. Stroud was so involved in his business that this alone required a full-time prison secretary. Additionally, most of the time, his birds were permitted to fly freely within his cells, and because of the great number of birds he kept, his cell was filthy. 

In 1931, an attempt to force Stroud to discontinue his business and get rid of his birds failed after Stroud and one of his mail correspondents, a bird researcher from Indiana named Della Mae Jones, made his story known to newspapers and magazines. A massive letter campaign and a 50,000-signature petition sent to President Herbert Hoover resulted in Stroud being permitted to keep his birds. Despite prison overcrowding, he was even given a second cell to house them. However, his letter-writing privileges were greatly curtailed. Jones and Stroud grew so close that she moved to Kansas in 1931, and started a business with him, selling his avian medicines.

Prison officials, fed up with Stroud's activities and their attendant publicity, intensified their efforts to transfer him from Leavenworth. Stroud discovered a Kansas law that forbade the transfer of prisoners married in Kansas. To this end, he married Jones by proxy, which infuriated the prison's administrators, who would not allow him to correspond with his wife.

Prison officials were not the only ones perturbed with Stroud's marriage; his mother was also incensed. They had a close relationship, but Elizabeth Stroud strongly disapproved of the marriage to Jones, believing women were nothing but trouble for her son. Whereas previously she had been a strong advocate for her son, helping him with legal battles, she now argued against his application for parole, and became a major obstacle in his attempts to be released from the prison system. She moved away from Leavenworth and refused any further contact with him. She died in 1937.

In 1933, Stroud advertised in a publication that he had not received any royalties from the sales of Diseases of Canaries. In retaliation, the publisher complained to the warden, and, as a result, proceedings were initiated to transfer Stroud to Alcatraz, where he would not be permitted to keep his birds. In the end Stroud was able to keep both his birds and canary-selling business at Leavenworth.

Stroud mostly avoided trouble for several more years, until it came to light that some of the equipment Stroud had requested for his lab was in fact being used as a home-made distillery to manufacture alcohol. Officials finally had the wedge they needed to drive Stroud out. Citing his "dangerous tendencies" and longstanding concerns about the sanitary conditions of his cell, they initiated proceedings to send him to Alcatraz.

Alcatraz

On December 16, 1942, Stroud was transferred to Alcatraz Federal Penitentiary, and became inmate No. 594. He reportedly was not informed in advance that he was to leave Leavenworth and his beloved birds, and was given just 10 minutes' notice of his departure. His birds and equipment were sent to his brother as Alcatraz's strict policies meant that he was unable to continue his avocation. He spent six years in segregation and another 11 confined to the hospital wing at the penitentiary.

In 1943, he was assessed by psychiatrist Romney M. Ritchey, who diagnosed him as a psychopath, with an I.Q. of 112 (his initial report in 1942 based on Leavenworth states that he had an I.Q. of 116). While there, he wrote two manuscripts: Bobbie, an autobiography, and Looking Outward: A History of the U.S. Prison System from Colonial Times to the Formation of the Bureau of Prisons. A judge ruled that Stroud had the right to write and keep such manuscripts, but upheld the warden's decision to ban their publication. After Stroud's death, the transcripts were delivered to his lawyer, Richard English.

Rumors of Stroud's homosexuality were noted at Alcatraz. According to Donald Hurley, whose father was a guard at Alcatraz, "Whenever Stroud was around anyone, which was seldom, he was watched very closely, as prison officials were very aware of his overt homosexual tendencies." In an interview with Hurley for his book, a former inmate heard Stroud was always in 'dog block' (solitary confinement) or later in the hospital because he was a 'wolf' (aggressive homosexual) who had a bad temper."

In February 1963 Stroud met and talked with actor Burt Lancaster, who portrayed him in The Birdman of Alcatraz. Stroud never got to see the film or read the book it was based on but did share one of the problems that prevented parole, that he was an "admitted homosexual." Lancaster quoted Stroud as saying, "Let's face it, I am 73 years old. Does that answer your question about whether I would be a dangerous homosexual?"

During his 17-year term at Alcatraz, Stroud was allowed access to the prison library, and began studying law. Occasionally, he was permitted to play chess with one of the guards. Stroud began petitioning the government that his long prison term amounted to cruel and unusual punishment. In 1959, with his health failing, Stroud was transferred to the Medical Center for Federal Prisoners in Springfield, Missouri. However, his attempts to be released were unsuccessful.

Death
On November 21, 1963, Robert Stroud died at the Springfield Medical Center at the age of 73, having been incarcerated for the last 54 years of his life, of which 42 were spent in solitary confinement. He was interred in the old Masonic Cemetery near Metropolis, Illinois, after a private funeral ceremony at Aikins-Farmer Funeral Home on November 25.

Legacy

Stroud is considered to be one of the most notorious criminals in American history. Robert Niemi states that Stroud had a "superior intellect," and became a "first-rate ornithologist and author," but was an "extremely dangerous and menacing psychopath, disliked and distrusted by his jailers and fellow inmates." 
However, by his last years, Stroud's behavior had improved and he was viewed more favorably; Judge Becker considered Stroud to be modest, no longer a danger to society, and as having a genuine love for birds. Given his level of notoriety, the crimes he committed were unremarkable, especially as the assaults he committed had a clear cause. Carl Sifakais considers Stroud to have been a "brilliant self-taught expert on birds, and possibly the best-known example of self-improvement and rehabilitation in the U.S. prison system."

Because of Stroud's contributions to the field of ornithology, he gained a large following of thousands of bird breeders and poultry raisers who demanded his release, and for many years a "Committee to Release Robert F. Stroud" campaigned to have Stroud released from prison. However, because Stroud had killed a federal officer, his punishment in solitary confinement remained intact. In 1963, Richard M. English, a young lawyer who had campaigned for John F. Kennedy in California, took to the cause of securing Stroud's release. He met with former President Harry S. Truman to enlist support, but Truman declined.  He also met with senior Kennedy-administration officials who were studying the subject.

English took the last photo of Stroud, in which he is shown with a green visor.  The warden of the prison attempted to have English prosecuted for bringing something into the prison he did not take out: unexposed film.  The authorities declined to take any action. Upon Stroud's death, his personal property, including original manuscripts, was delivered to English, as his last legal representative, who later turned over some of the possessions to the Audubon Society.

Stroud became the subject of a 1955 book by Thomas E. Gaddis, Birdman of Alcatraz. Gaddis, who strongly advocated rehabilitation in the prisons, portrayed Stroud in favorable light.  This was adapted by Guy Trosper for the 1962 film of the same name, directed by John Frankenheimer. It starred Burt Lancaster as Stroud, Karl Malden as a fictionalized and renamed warden, Thelma Ritter as Stroud's mother and Betty Field as his wife, renamed Stella Johnson in the film. However, former inmates of Alcatraz say that the real Stroud was far more sinister, dangerous and unpleasant than the fictionalized version portrayed in the book and film. One said "he was a vicious killer. I think Burt Lancaster owes us all an apology."

Art Carney played Stroud in the 1980 TV movie Alcatraz: The Whole Shocking Story, and Dennis Farina played Stroud in the 1987 TV movie Six Against the Rock, a dramatization of the Battle of Alcatraz of 1946.

In music, Stroud has been the subject of the instrumental "Birdman of Alcatraz" from Rick Wakeman's Criminal Record (1977), a concept album about criminality, and the song "The Birdman" by Our Lady Peace is also about him. Several video games such as Galerians and Team Fortress 2 pay homage to him.

References 

Bibliography

External links 

 Alcatraz History
 Crime Library
 Stroud's Digest on the Diseases of Birds

1890 births
1963 deaths
American people of German descent
Inmates of Alcatraz Federal Penitentiary
20th-century American memoirists
American convicts who became writers
American ornithological writers
American male non-fiction writers
American people convicted of manslaughter
American people who died in prison custody
American prisoners sentenced to death
American prisoners sentenced to life imprisonment
American people convicted of assault
Writers from Seattle
Prisoners sentenced to life imprisonment by the United States federal government
Prisoners who died in United States federal government detention
20th-century American criminals
20th-century American zoologists
20th-century American male writers